Aleksandar Cvetković (Serbian Cyrillic: Александар Цветковић; born September 12, 1993) is a Serbian professional basketball player for Coosur Real Betis of the Liga ACB.

Club career

Crvena zvezda
Cvetković grew up with Crvena zvezda youth team. In 2010 he stepped into the first team under the guidance of head coach Mihailo Uvalin. In 2012 he competed at Nike Hoop Summit representing Serbia. Cvetković has named the 7th 2011 FIBA Europe Young Player of the Year in February 2011. On 21 November 2012, Cvetković has played his most efficient game in the 2012–13 EuroCup against Dinamo Sassari, where he scored 9 points. On 24 October 2013, he made his debut for Crvena zvezda in EuroLeague against Maccabi Tel Aviv. On 20 December 2013 against Lietuvos rytas in the last round of regular season in EuroLeague, Cvetković has scored 4 points for almost seven minutes on the court. Cvetković scored 8 points for the Crvena zvezda, against Radnički Kragujevac in the third round of ABA League and that is his most efficient game in the half-season league for Crvena zvezda in ABA League.

Cvetković has not chested the starting line-up in the Crvena zvezda, so is on the winter of 2014 he went on a loan in MZT Skopje by the end of the season. In the summer of 2015, Cvetković moved to the test in Valencia. Cvetković has played several friendly matches where he was solid but did not pass the test, so in September he left the preparation in Valencia.

MZT Skopje
On 27 December 2013, due to his dissatisfaction over playing time, the 20-year-old was sent on loan to MZT Skopje until the end of the 2014–15 season. On 3 January 2014, Cvetković made his debut in ABA League for MZT scoring 10 in 73–63 home win against Szolnoki Olaj. On 1 March 2014, he was top scorer with 13 points in his team in away victory 65–79, against Igokea. Cvetković was the best in his team against Cibona in Zagreb and was close to reach triple-double with achieved 17 points, he also had 10 rebounds and 8 assists. After match, Cvetković was voted of mvp of 23. round of ABA League. Counting only games in MZT, Cvetković in 12 games played he averaged 8 points, 2.3 assists and 3.1 rebounds per game in the ABA League.

Partizan
On 29 September 2015, he signed with Partizan Belgrade. He was given the number 4 shirt that previously carried Milenko Tepić. He made his debut for Partizan on 2 October 2015, against Metalac in the first round of the ABA League and was most efficient in his team with 13 points. On 16 January 2016, against Krka, Cvetković was the most efficient player in that match with 21 points, 3 rebounds and 7 assist in the victory of his team's 70–75. After the game he is declared for the MVP of 20th round of the ABA League with 42 efficiency. On 25 January 2016, in the eternal derby against Crvena zvezda and his former club, he scored 16 points and had 3 rebounds and 3 assists in the big victory of his team's 86–81. During the 2015–16 season, in 23 games he averaged 10.3 points, 2.4 rebounds and 3.3 assists in ABA League.

Spain
On July 26, 2016, Cvetković signed a one-year contract with Spanish club ICL Manresa. On August 23, 2017, he signed with Estudiantes. On August 15, 2018, he signed with Cafés Candelas Breogán of the Liga ACB.

On November 25, 2019, he has a temporary contract with Baxi Manresa of the Spanish Liga ACB to replace the injured Frankie Ferrari.

On June 14, 2020, he has signed with Mega Bemax of the ABA League. One month later he parted ways with Mega and signed for Movistar Estudiantes.

He joined Plateros de Fresnillo of the Mexican Liga Nacional de Baloncesto Profesional in 2021 and averaged 7.6 points, 1.9 rebounds, and 4.4 assists per game.

Cvetković signed with Real Betis on November 26.

National team career

2009 Under-16 European Championship
In the first match of the tournament, Cvetković has scored 12 points and had 3 rebounds and 5 assists in his team's defeat of the France. Cvetković played his best game of the tournament against Spain in the semifinals where he scored 24 points and had 7 rebounds in the defeat of his team's 75–88. Cvetković scored double-double with 20 points and 10 rebounds against Poland in a match for third place. Cvetković as one of the best players of Serbia and as her captain won a bronze medal at the 2009 FIBA Europe Under-16 Championship in Lithuania. In 9 games played on the tournament, Cvetković has averaged was 14.6 points, 4.8 rebounds and 2.4 assists.

2011 Under-19 World Cup
On 30 June 2011 in the first match of the group stage against China, Cvetković was the most efficient player of his team with 20 scored points, 3 rebounds and 6 assists in the victory of his team's 73–78. A day later against United States, he also was the most effective player in this match with 20 scored points, 4 rebounds and 2 assists. On 2 July 2011 against Egypt, Cvetković has played his best game of the tournament, where he scored 24 points with 4 rebounds and 3 assists in the victory of his team's 85–67. In the final Serbia was lost to Latvia 67–85 and cvetkovic also played well and score 11 points, 5 rebounds, 1 assist. Aleksandar Cvetković has played 9 games in the tournament and only on 2 matches he had single digit points. In 9 games played on the tournament, he has averaged was 14.4 points, 3.8 rebounds and 2.7 assists. After the tournament he was named to the All–Star Five.

Career statistics

EuroLeague

|-
| style="text-align:left;"| 2013–14
| style="text-align:left;"| Crvena zvezda
| 3 || 0 || 3.54 || ||  || 100% || 0.3 || 1 || 1 || 0 || 1.3 || 2

Domestic leagues

References

External links
Aleksandar Cvetković at acb.com 

 Profile at aba-liga.com
 Profile at eurocupbasketball.com
 Profile at fiba.com
 Profile at draftexpress.com

1993 births
Living people
ABA League players
Basketball League of Serbia players
Basketball players from Belgrade
Bàsquet Manresa players
CB Breogán players
CB Estudiantes players
KK Crvena zvezda players
KK Igokea players
KK MZT Skopje players
KK Partizan players
Liga ACB players
Point guards
Real Betis Baloncesto players
Serbian expatriate basketball people in Bosnia and Herzegovina
Serbian expatriate basketball people in Mexico
Serbian expatriate basketball people in North Macedonia
Serbian expatriate basketball people in Spain
Serbian men's basketball players